Tibicinini is a tribe of cicadas in the family Cicadidae. There are about 8 genera and at least 100 described species in Tibicinini, found in the Holarctic.

Genera
These eight genera belong to the tribe Tibicinini:
 Clidophleps Van Duzee, 1915
 Okanagana Distant, 1905
 Okanagodes Davis, 1919
 Paharia Distant, 1905
 Subpsaltria Chen, 1943
 Subtibicina Lee, 2012
 Tibicina Kolenati, 1857
 Tibicinoides Distant, 1914

References

Further reading

 
 
 
 
 
 
 
 

 
Tibicininae
Cicadidae genera